These are the Billboard magazine R&B albums that reached number one in 1991.

See also: 1991 in music, R&B number-one hits of 1991 (USA)

Chart history

See also
1991 in music
R&B number-one hits of 1991 (USA)

1991